Powder metallurgy (PM) is a term covering a wide range of ways in which materials or components are made from metal powders. PM processes can reduce or eliminate the need for subtractive processes in manufacturing, lowering material losses and reducing the cost of the final product.

Powder metallurgy is also used to make unique materials impossible to get from melting or forming in other ways. A very important product of this type is tungsten carbide (WC). WC is used to cut and form other metals and is made from WC particles bonded with cobalt. It is very widely used in industry for tools of many types and globally ~50,000 tonnes/year (t/y) is made by PM. Other products include sintered filters, porous oil-impregnated bearings, electrical contacts and diamond tools.

Since the advent of industrial production–scale metal powder–based additive manufacturing (AM) in the 2010s, selective laser sintering and other metal AM processes are a new category of commercially important powder metallurgy applications.

Overview
The powder metallurgy press and sinter process generally consists of three basic steps: powder blending (pulverisation), die compaction, and sintering. Compaction is generally performed at room temperature, and the elevated-temperature process of sintering is usually conducted at atmospheric pressure and under carefully controlled atmosphere composition. Optional secondary processing such as coining or heat treatment often follows to obtain special properties or enhanced precision.

One of the older such methods, and still one used to make around 1 Mt/y of structural components of iron-based alloys, is the process of blending fine (<180 microns) metal (normally iron) powders with additives such as a lubricant wax, carbon, copper, and/or nickel, pressing them into a die of the desired shape, and then heating the compressed material ("green part") in a controlled atmosphere to bond the material by sintering. This produces precise parts, normally very close to the die dimensions, but with 5–15% porosity, and thus sub-wrought steel properties.  There are several other PM processes which have been developed over the last fifty years. These include:
 Powder forging: A "preform" made by the conventional "press and sinter" method is heated and then hot forged to full density, resulting in practically as-wrought properties.
 Hot isostatic pressing (HIP): Here the powder (normally gas atomized, spherical type) is filled into a mould, normally consisting of a metallic "can" of suitable shape. The can is vibrated, then evacuated and sealed.  It is then placed in a hot isostatic press, where it is heated to a homologous temperature of around 0.7, and subjected to an external gas pressure of ~100 MPa (1000 bar, 15,000 psi) for several hours. This results in a shaped part of full density with as-wrought or better, properties. HIP was invented in the 1950-60s and entered tonnage production in the 1970-80s. In 2015, it was used to produce ~25,000 t/y of stainless and tool steels, as well as important parts of superalloys for jet engines.
 Metal injection moulding (MIM):  Here the powder, normally very fine (<25 microns) and spherical, is mixed with plastic or wax binder to near the maximum solid loading, typically around 65vol%, and injection moulded to form a "green" part of complex geometry. This part is then heated or otherwise treated to remove the binder (debinding) to give a "brown" part. This part is then sintered, and shrinks by ~18% to give a complex and 95–99% dense finished part (surface roughness ~3 microns). Invented in the 1970s, production has increased since 2000 with an estimated global volume in 2014 of 12,000 t worth €1265 million.
 Electric current assisted sintering (ECAS) technologies rely on electric currents to densify powders, with the advantage of reducing production time dramatically (from 15 minutes of the slowest ECAS to a few microseconds of the fastest), not requiring a long furnace heat and allowing near theoretical densities but with the drawback of simple shapes. Powders employed in ECAS can avoid binders thanks to the possibility of direct sintering, without the need of pre-pressing and a green compact. Molds are designed for the final part shape since the powders densify while filling the cavity under an applied pressure thus avoiding the problem of shape variations caused by non isotropic sintering and distortions caused by gravity at high temperatures. The most common of these technologies is hot pressing, which has been under use for the production of the diamond tools employed in the construction industry. Spark plasma sintering and electro sinter forging are two modern, industrial commercial ECAS technologies.
 Additive manufacturing (AM) is a relatively novel family of techniques which use metal powders (among other materials, such as plastics) to make parts by laser sintering or melting. This is a process under rapid development , and whether to classify it as a PM process is perhaps uncertain at this stage. Processes include 3D printing, selective laser sintering (SLS), selective laser melting (SLM), and electron beam melting (EBM).

History and capabilities
The history of powder metallurgy and the art of metal and ceramic sintering are intimately related to each other. Sintering involves the production of a hard solid metal or ceramic piece from a starting powder. The ancient Incas made jewelry and other artifacts from precious metal powders, though mass manufacturing of PM products did not begin until the mid or late 19th century. In these early manufacturing operations, iron was extracted by hand from metal sponge following reduction and was then reintroduced as a powder for final melting or sintering.

A much wider range of products can be obtained from powder processes than from direct alloying of fused materials. In melting operations the "phase rule" applies to all pure and combined elements and strictly dictates the distribution of liquid and solid phases which can exist for specific compositions. In addition, whole body melting of starting materials is required for alloying, thus imposing unwelcome chemical, thermal, and containment constraints on manufacturing. Unfortunately, the handling of aluminium/iron powders poses major problems. Other substances that are especially reactive with atmospheric oxygen, such as titanium, are sinterable in special atmospheres or with temporary coatings.

In powder metallurgy or ceramics it is possible to fabricate components which otherwise would decompose or disintegrate. All considerations of solid-liquid phase changes can be ignored, so powder processes are more flexible than casting, extrusion, or forging techniques. Controllable characteristics of products prepared using various powder technologies include mechanical, magnetic, and other unconventional properties of such materials as porous solids, aggregates, and intermetallic compounds. Competitive characteristics of manufacturing processing (e.g. tool wear, complexity, or vendor options) also may be closely controlled.

Powder production techniques
Any fusible material can be atomized. Several techniques have been developed which permit large production rates of powdered particles, often with considerable control over the size ranges of the final grain population. Powders may be prepared by crushing, grinding, chemical reactions, or electrolytic deposition. The most commonly used powders are copper-base and iron-base materials.  

Powders of the elements titanium, vanadium, thorium, niobium, tantalum, calcium, and uranium have been produced by high-temperature reduction of the corresponding nitrides and carbides. Iron, nickel, uranium, and beryllium submicrometre powders are obtained by reducing metallic oxalates and formates. Exceedingly fine particles also have been prepared by directing a stream of molten metal through a high-temperature plasma jet or flame,  atomizing the material. Various chemical and flame associated powdering processes are adopted in part to prevent serious degradation of particle surfaces by atmospheric oxygen.

In tonnage terms, the production of iron powders for PM structural part production dwarfs the production of all of the non-ferrous metal powders combined. Virtually all iron powders are produced by one of two processes: the sponge iron process or water atomization.

Sponge iron process 
The longest established of these processes is the sponge iron process, the leading example of a family of processes involving solid state reduction of an oxide. In the process, selected magnetite (Fe3O4) ore is mixed with coke and lime and placed in a silicon carbide retort. The filled retort is then heated in a kiln, where the reduction process leaves an iron “cake” and a slag. In subsequent steps, the retort is emptied, the reduced iron sponge is separated from the slag and is crushed and annealed.

The resultant powder is highly irregular in particle shape, therefore ensuring good “green strength” so that die-pressed compacts can be readily handled prior to sintering, and each particle contains internal pores (hence the term “sponge”) so that the good green strength is available at low compacted density levels.

Sponge iron provides the
feedstock for all iron-based self-lubricating bearings, and still accounts for around 30% of iron powder usage in PM structural parts.

Atomization 
Atomization is accomplished by forcing a molten metal stream through an orifice at moderate pressures. A gas is introduced into the metal stream just before it leaves the nozzle, serving to create turbulence as the entrained gas expands (due to heating) and exits into a large collection volume exterior to the orifice. The collection volume is filled with gas to promote further turbulence of the molten metal jet. Air and powder streams are segregated using gravity or cyclonic separation. Most atomized powders are annealed, which helps reduce the oxide and carbon content. The water atomized particles are smaller, cleaner, and nonporous and have a greater breadth of size, which allows better compacting. The particles produced through this method are normally of spherical or pear shape. Usually, they also carry a layer of oxide over them.

There are three types of atomization:
 Liquid atomization
 Gas atomization
 Centrifugal atomization

Simple atomization techniques are available in which liquid metal is forced through an orifice at a sufficiently high velocity to ensure turbulent flow. The usual performance index used is the Reynolds number R = fvd/n, where f = fluid density, v = velocity of the exit stream, d = diameter of the opening, and n = absolute viscosity. At low R the liquid jet oscillates, but at higher velocities the stream becomes turbulent and breaks into droplets. Pumping energy is applied to droplet formation with very low efficiency (on the order of 1%) and control over the size distribution of the metal particles produced is rather poor. Other techniques such as nozzle vibration, nozzle asymmetry, multiple impinging streams, or molten-metal injection into ambient gas are all available to increase atomization efficiency, produce finer grains, and to narrow the particle size distribution. Unfortunately, it is difficult to eject metals through orifices smaller than a few millimeters in diameter, which in practice limits the minimum size of powder grains to approximately 10 μm. Atomization also produces a wide spectrum of particle sizes, necessitating downstream classification by screening and remelting a significant fraction of the grain boundary.

Centrifugal disintegration 
Centrifugal disintegration of molten particles offers one way around these problems. Extensive experience is available with iron, steel, and aluminium. Metal to be powdered is formed into a rod which is introduced into a chamber through a rapidly rotating spindle. Opposite the spindle tip is an electrode from which an arc is established which heats the metal rod. As the tip material fuses, the rapid rod rotation throws off tiny melt droplets which solidify before hitting the chamber walls. A circulating gas sweeps particles from the chamber.  Similar techniques could be employed in space or on the Moon. The chamber wall could be rotated to force new powders into remote collection vessels, and the electrode could be replaced by a solar mirror focused at the end of the rod.

An alternative approach capable of producing a very narrow distribution of grain sizes but with low throughput consists of a rapidly spinning bowl heated to well above the melting point of the material to be powdered. Liquid metal, introduced onto the surface of the basin near the center at flow rates adjusted to permit a thin metal film to skim evenly up the walls and over the edge, breaks into droplets, each approximately the thickness of the film.

Other techniques
Another powder-production technique involves a thin jet of liquid metal intersected by high-speed streams of atomized water which break the jet into drops and cool the powder before it reaches the bottom of the bin. In subsequent operations the powder is dried. This is called water atomization. The advantage of water atomization is that metal solidifies faster than by gas atomization since the heat capacity of water is some magnitudes higher than gases. Since the solidification rate is inversely proportional to the particle size, smaller particles can be made using water atomization. The smaller the particles, the more homogeneous the micro structure will be. Notice that particles will have a more irregular shape and the particle size distribution will be wider. In addition, some surface contamination can occur by oxidation skin formation. Powder can be reduced by some kind of pre-consolidation treatment, such as annealing used for the manufacture of ceramic tools.

Powder compaction

Powder compaction is the process of compacting metal powder in a die through the application of high pressures. Typically the tools are held in the vertical orientation with the punch tool forming the bottom of the cavity. The powder is then compacted into a shape and then ejected from the die cavity. In a number of these applications the parts may require very little additional work for their intended use; making for very cost efficient manufacturing.

The density of the compacted powder increases with the amount of pressure applied. Typical pressures range from 80 psi to 1000 psi (0.5 MPa to 7 MPa), pressures from 1000 psi to 1,000,000 psi have been obtained. Pressure of 10 t/in² to 50 t/in² (150 MPa to 700 MPa) are commonly used for metal powder compaction. To attain the same compression ratio across a component with more than one level or height, it is necessary to work with multiple lower punches. A cylindrical workpiece is made by single-level tooling. A more complex shape can be made by the common multiple-level tooling.

Production rates of 15 to 30 parts per minute are common.

There are four major classes of tool styles: single-action compaction, used for thin, flat components; opposed double-action with two punch motions, which accommodates thicker components; double-action with floating die; and double action withdrawal die. Double action classes give much better density distribution than single action. Tooling must be designed so that it will withstand the extreme pressure without deforming or bending. Tools must be made from materials that are polished and wear-resistant.

Better workpiece materials can be obtained by repressing and re-sintering.

Die pressing

The dominant technology for the forming of products from powder materials, in terms of both tonnage quantities and numbers of parts produced, is die pressing. There are mechanical, servo-electrical and hydraulic presses available in the market, whereby the biggest powder throughput is processed by hydraulic presses.
This forming technology involves a production cycle comprising:

 Filling a die cavity with a known volume of the powder feedstock, delivered from a fill shoe. 
 Compaction of the powder within the die with punches to form the compact. Generally, compaction pressure is applied through punches from both ends of the toolset in order to reduce the level of density gradient within the compact. 
 Ejection of the compact from the die, using the lower punch(es) withdrawal from the die.
 Removal of the compact from the upper face of the die using the fill shoe in the fill stage of the next cycle, or an automation system or robot.

This cycle offers a readily automated and high production rate process.

Design considerations
Probably the most basic consideration is being able to remove the part from the die after it is pressed, along with avoiding sharp corners in the design. Keeping the maximum surface area below  and the height-to-diameter ratio below 7-to-1 is recommended.

One of the major advantages of this process is its ability to produce complex geometries. Parts with undercuts and threads require a secondary machining operation.

Isostatic pressing
In some pressing operations, such as hot isostatic pressing (HIP) compact formation and sintering occur simultaneously. This procedure, together with explosion-driven compressive techniques is used extensively in the production of high-temperature and high-strength parts such as turbine disks for jet engines. In most applications of powder metallurgy the compact is hot-pressed, heated to a temperature above which the materials cannot remain work-hardened. Hot pressing lowers the pressures required to reduce porosity and speeds welding and grain deformation processes. It also permits better dimensional control of the product, lessens sensitivity to physical characteristics of starting materials, and allows powder to be compressed to higher densities than with cold pressing, resulting in higher strength. Negative aspects of hot pressing include shorter die life, slower throughput because of powder heating, and the frequent necessity for protective atmospheres during forming and cooling stages.

Isostatic powder compacting
Isostatic powder compacting is a mass-conserving shaping process. Fine metal particles are placed into a flexible mould and then high fluid pressure is applied to the mold, in contrast to the direct pressure applied by the die faces of a die pressing process.  The resulting article is then sintered in a furnace which increases the strength of the part by bonding the metal particles. This manufacturing process produces very little scrap metal and can be used to make many different shapes. The tolerances that this process can achieve are very precise, ranging from +/- 0.008 inches (0.2 mm) for axial dimensions and +/- 0.020 inches (0.5 mm) for radial dimensions.  This is the most efficient type of powder compacting (the following subcategories are also from this reference).  This operation is generally only applicable on small production quantities, although the cost of a mold much lower than that of pressing dies it is generally not reusable and the production time is much longer.

The density of isostatic compacted parts is 5% to 10% higher than with other powder metallurgy processes.

Equipment
There are many types of equipment used in isostatic powder compacting. There is the mold containing the part, which is flexible, a flexible outer pressure mold that contains and seals the mold, and the machine delivering the pressure. There are also devices to control the amount of pressure and how long the pressure is held.

Geometrical possibilities

Tool style
Isostatic tools are available in three styles, free mold (wet-bag), coarse mold (damp-bag) and fixed mold (dry-bag).  The free mold style is the traditional style of isostatic compaction and is not generally used for high production work. In free mold tooling the mold is removed and filled outside the canister. Damp bag is where the mold is located in the canister, yet filled outside. In fixed mold tooling, the mold is contained within the canister, which facilitates automation of the process.

Hot isostatic pressing

Hot isostatic pressing (HIP) compresses and sinters the part simultaneously by applying heat ranging from 900 °F (480 °C) to 2250 °F (1230 °C). Argon gas is the most common gas used in HIP because it is an inert gas, thus prevents chemical reactions during the operation.

Cold isostatic pressing
Cold isostatic pressing (CIP) uses fluid as a means of applying pressure to the mold at room temperature. After removal the part still needs to be sintered.
It is helpful in distributing pressure uniformly over the compaction material contained in a rubber bag.

Design considerations
Advantages over standard powder compaction are the possibility of thinner walls and larger workpieces. Height to diameter ratio has no limitation. No specific limitations exist in wall thickness variations, undercuts, reliefs, threads, and cross holes. No lubricants are need for isostatic powder compaction. The minimum wall thickness is 0.05 inches (1.27 mm) and the product can have a weight between 40 and 300 pounds (18 and 136 kg). There is 25 to 45% shrinkage of the powder after compacting.

Sintering

After compaction, powdered materials are heated in a controlled atmosphere in a process known as sintering. During this process, the surfaces of the particles are bonded and desirable properties are achieved.

Sintering of powder metals is a process in which particles under pressure chemically bond to themselves in order to form a coherent shape when exposed to a high temperature. The temperature in which the particles are sintered is most commonly below the melting point of the main component in the powder. If the temperature is above the melting point of a component in the powder metal part, the liquid of the melted particles fills the pores. This type of sintering is known as liquid-state sintering. A major challenge with sintering in general is knowing the effect of the process on the dimensions of the compact particles. This is especially difficult for tooling purposes in which specific dimensions may be needed. It is most common for the sintered part to shrink and become denser, but it can also expand or experience no net change.

The main driving force for solid state sintering is an excess of surface free energy. The process of solid-state sintering is complex and dependent on the material and furnace (temperature and gas) conditions. There are six main stages that sintering processes can be grouped in which may overlap with one another: 1 initial bonding among particles, 2) neck growth, 3) pore channel closure, 4) pore rounding, 5) densification or pore shrinkage, and 6) pore coarsening. The main mechanisms present in these stages are evaporation, condensation, grain boundaries, volume diffusion, and plastic deformation.

Most sintering furnaces contain three zones with three different properties that help to carry out the six steps above. The first zone, commonly coined the burn-off or purge stage, is designed to combust air, burn any contaminants such as lubricant or binders, and slowly raise the temperature of the compact materials. If the temperature of the compact parts is raised too quickly, the air in the pores will be at a very high internal pressure which could lead to expansion or fracture of the part. The second zone, known as the high-temperature stage, is used to produce solid-state diffusion and particle bonding. The material is seeking to lower its surface energy and does so by moving toward the points of contact between particles. The contact points become larger and eventually a solid mass with small pores is created. The third zone, also called the cooling period, is used to cool down the parts while still in a controlled atmosphere. This is an important zone as it prevents oxidation from immediate contact with the air or a phenomenon known as rapid cooling. All of the three stages must be carried out in a controlled atmosphere containing no oxygen. Hydrogen, nitrogen, dissociated ammonia, and cracked hydrocarbons are common gases pumped into the furnace zones providing a reducing atmosphere, preventing oxide formation.

During this process, a number of characteristics are increased including the strength, ductility, toughness, and electrical and thermal conductivity of the material. If different elemental powders are compact and sintered, the material would form into alloys and intermetallic phases.

As the pore sizes decrease, the density of the material will increase. As stated above, this shrinkage is a huge problem in making parts or tooling in which particular dimensions are required. The shrinkage of test materials is monitored and used to manipulate the furnace conditions or to oversize the compact materials in order to achieve the desired dimensions. Although, sintering does not deplete the compact part of porosity. In general, powder metal parts contain five to twenty-five percent porosity after sintering.

To allow efficient stacking of product in the furnace during sintering and prevent parts sticking together, many manufacturers separate ware using ceramic powder separator sheets. These sheets are available in various materials such as alumina, zirconia, and magnesia. They are also available in fine, medium, and coarse particle sizes. By matching the material and particle size to the wares being sintered, surface damage and contamination can be reduced, while maximizing furnace loading per batch.

One recently developed technique for high-speed sintering involves passing high electric current through a powder to preferentially heat the asperities. Most of the energy serves to melt that portion of the compact where migration is desirable for densification; comparatively little energy is absorbed by the bulk materials and forming machinery. Naturally, this technique is not applicable to electrically insulating powders.

Continuous powder processing
The phrase "continuous process" should be used only to describe modes of manufacturing which could be extended indefinitely in time. Normally, however, the term refers to processes whose products are much longer in one physical dimension than in the other two. Compression, rolling, and extrusion are the most common examples.

In a simple compression process, powder flows from a bin onto a two-walled channel and is repeatedly compressed vertically by a horizontally stationary punch. After stripping the compress from the conveyor, the compacted mass is introduced into a sintering furnace. An even easier approach is to spray powder onto a moving belt and sinter it without compression. However, good methods for stripping cold-pressed materials from moving belts are hard to find. One alternative that avoids the belt-stripping difficulty altogether is the manufacture of metal sheets using opposed hydraulic rams, although weakness lines across the sheet may arise during successive press operations.

Powders can also be rolled to produce sheets. The strip is then sintered and subjected to another rolling and further sintering. Rolling is commonly used to produce sheet metal for electrical and electronic components, as well as coins. Considerable work also has been done on rolling multiple layers of different materials simultaneously into sheets.

Extrusion processes are of two general types. In one type, the powder is mixed with a binder or plasticizer at room temperature; in the other, the powder is extruded at elevated temperatures without fortification. Extrusions with binders are used extensively in the preparation of tungsten-carbide composites. Tubes, complex sections, and spiral drill shapes are manufactured in extended lengths and diameters varying in the range . Hard metal wires of  diameter have been drawn from powder stock. At the opposite extreme, large extrusions on a tonnage basis may be feasible.

For softer, easier to form metals such as aluminium and copper alloys continuous extrusion may also be performed using processes such as conform or continuous rotary extrusion. These processes use a rotating wheel with a groove around its circumference to drive the loose powder through a forming die. Through a combination of high pressure and a complex strain path the powder particles deform, generate a large amount of frictional heat and bond together to form a bulk solid. Theoretically fully continuous operation is possible as long as the powder can be fed into the process.

There appears to be no limitation to the variety of metals and alloys that can be extruded, provided the temperatures and pressures involved are within the capabilities of die materials. Extrusion lengths may range from 3 to 30 m and diameters from 0.2 to 1 m. Modern presses are largely automatic and operate at high speeds (on the order of m/s).

Shock (dynamic) consolidation
Shock consolidation, or dynamic consolidation, is an experimental technique of consolidating powders using high pressure shock waves.  These are commonly produced by impacting the workpiece with an explosively accelerated plate.  Despite being researched for a long time, the technique still has some problems in controlability and uniformity. However, it offers some valuable potential advantages.  As an example, consolidation occurs so rapidly that metastable microstructures may be retained.

Electric current assisted sintering
These techniques employ electric currents to drive or enhance sintering. Through a combination of electric currents and mechanical pressure powders sinter more rapidly thereby reducing the sintering time compared to conventional thermal solutions. The techniques can be divided into two main categories: resistance sintering, which incorporates spark plasma sintering and hot pressing; and electric discharge sintering, such as capacitor discharge sintering or its derivative, electro sinter forging. Resistance sintering techniques are consolidation methods based on temperature, where heating of the mold and of the powders is accomplished through electric currents, usually with a characteristic processing time of 15 to 30 minutes.  On the other hand, electric discharge sintering methods rely on high-density currents (from 0.1 to 1 kA/mm^2) to directly sinter electrically conductive powders, with a characteristic time between tens of microseconds to hundreds of milliseconds.

Special products
Many special products are possible with powder metallurgy technology. A nonexhaustive list includes Al2O3 whiskers coated with very thin oxide layers for improved refraction; iron compacts with Al2O3 coatings for improved high-temperature creep strength; light bulb filaments made with powder technology; linings for friction brakes; metal glasses for high-strength films and ribbons; heat shields for spacecraft reentry into Earth's atmosphere; electrical contacts for handling large current flows; magnets; microwave ferrites; filters for gases; and bearings which can be infiltrated with lubricants.

Extremely thin films and tiny spheres exhibit high strength. One application of this observation is to coat brittle materials in whisker form with a submicrometre film of much softer metal (e.g. cobalt-coated tungsten). The surface strain of the thin layer places the harder metal under compression, so that when the entire composite is sintered the rupture strength increases markedly. With this method, strengths on the order of 2.8 GPa versus 550 MPa have been observed for, respectively, coated (25% cobalt) and uncoated tungsten carbides.

Hazards

The special materials and processes used in powder metallurgy can pose hazards to life and property. The high surface-area-to-volume ratio of the powders can increase their chemical reactivity in biological exposures (for example, inhalation or ingestion), and increases the risk of dust explosions. Materials considered relatively benign in bulk can pose special toxicological risks when in a finely divided form. Inhalation of heavy metals can result in many health issues. Lead and cadmium are generally toxic, and cobalt can cause asthma and fibrosis in sensitive individuals.

See also
Electro sinter forging
Global Powder Metallurgy Property Database
Mechanical powder press
Selective laser melting
Selective laser sintering
Sintering
Spark plasma sintering
Spray forming

References

Cited sources

Further reading
An earlier version of this article was copied from Appendix 4C of Advanced Automation for Space Missions, a NASA report in the public domain.
 R. M. German, "Powder Metallurgy and Particulate Materials Processing," Metal Powder Industries Federation, Princeton, New Jersey, 2005.
 F. Thummler and R.Oberacker "An Introduction to Powder Metallurgy" The institute of Materials, London 1993
 G. S. Upadhyaya, "Sintered Metallic and Ceramic Materials" John Wiley and Sons, West Sussex, England, 2000

External links
Rapid manufacturing technique developed at the KU Leuven, Belgium
Slow motion video images of metal atomization at the Ames Laboratory
APMI International "The Global Professional Society for Powder Metallurgy", a non-profit organization

Metalworking
Ceramic engineering
Metallurgy